Ray Luther "Dad" Hale (February 18, 1880 – February 1, 1946) was a Major League Baseball pitcher. In 11 career games, he had a 1–4 record, with 7 games started and a 5.67 ERA.

Hale was born and died in Allegan, Michigan.

References

External links

1880 births
1946 deaths
Boston Beaneaters players
Baltimore Orioles (1901–02) players
Major League Baseball pitchers
Baseball players from Michigan
Chatham Reds players
Los Angeles Angels (minor league) players
Memphis Egyptians players
Montgomery Senators players
People from Allegan, Michigan